Harry Daniels (June 23, 1900 – February 21, 1965) was an American water polo player. He competed in the men's tournament at the 1928 Summer Olympics.

See also
 List of men's Olympic water polo tournament goalkeepers

References

1900 births
1965 deaths
Sportspeople from Boston
American male water polo players
Water polo goalkeepers
Olympic water polo players of the United States
Water polo players at the 1928 Summer Olympics